Kastamonu is a city in northern Turkey. It is the seat of Kastamonu Province and Kastamonu District. Its population is 125,622 (2021). It is located in the southern part of the province.

History 

The city is believed to have been founded in the 18th century BC. The town was known as Timonion (Τιμόνιον in Greek) during the Roman period.

The change of name of the town dates to the tenth century AD. Manuel Erotikos Komnenos, a prominent general and the father of the Byzantine emperor Isaac I Komnenos, was given lands around Kastamonu by Emperor Basil II and built a fortress there named Kastra Komnenon (Κάστρα Κομνηνῶν). Manuel came to the notice of Basil II because of his defence, in 978, of Nicaea against the rebel Bardas Skleros. The name Kastra Komnenon was shortened to Kastamone, and later Turkified to Kastamoni and Kastamonu.

Ibn Battuta visited the city, noting it as "one of the largest and finest cities, where commodities are abundant and prices low."  He stayed here forty days.

The famous Sufi saint of the city is Şeyh Shaban Veli (Şaban-ı Veli in Turkish, d. 976 AH/1569 AD).

The Dress Code Revolution of Kemal Atatürk started on August 23, 1925, at Kastamonu. Atatürk made his historical speech concerning the "Hat and Dress Revolution" during his visit to Kastamonu in 1925 in the Republican People's Party building. The building is now used as the Archeological Museum of Kastamonu. The possessions used by Atatürk in his Kastamonu visit are also exhibited in the museum.

Cuisine
Typical country fare in Kastamonu includes a quick rose jam made with sugared water, citric acid and gül mayası - the latter is a preparation of culinary-grade rose petals with sugar and citric acid that preserves them and brings out their flavor and fragrance. Homemade hot sauce is made by simmering grated tomato, garlic, Turkish red pepper, hot peppers, sunflower oil, salt and pepper on the stove. Sweet katmer is made by preparing a simple unleavened dough of flour, salt and water that is smeared with a tahini and sunflower oil mixture as it is folded.

Breakfast might include farm made cheese, olives, pekmez, fried potatoes, rose jam homemade hot sauce, eggs served hot in the pan (called sahanda yumurta), folded unleavened bread called katmer, fresh farm milk and black tea.

A speciality of Taşköprü, Kastamonu is freshly slaughtered whole lamb slow-cooked over the glowing embers of wood in a sealed, airtight "well" — this regional specialty is called kuyu kebabı in Turkish. A little water added to a tray ensures that steam keeps the meat moist throughout the cooking process.

Economic history
In the early 20th century, nickel was mined in the area around Kastamonu.

Education
Kastamonu is home to Kastamonu University, which was established in 2006 by incorporating existing colleges, schools, and institutes that were previously under Ankara University and Gazi University. Notable high schools in Kastamonu are: Abdurrahman Paşa Lisesi, also known as Kastamonu Lisesi, the first modern high school that was established in Anatolia in late Ottoman Empire. Kastamonu Mustafa Kaya Lisesi, an Anatolian high school, one of the most successful high schools in Turkey outside Istanbul, Ankara and İzmir.

Geography
The town consists of 20 quarters: Kuzeykent, Mehmet Akif Ersoy, Yavuz Selim, Budamış, Akmescit, Aktekke, Atabeygazi, Beyçelebi, Cebrail, Hepkebirler, Hisarardı, Honsalar, Inönü, Isfendiyar, Ismailbey, Kırkçeşme, Saraçlar, Topçuoğlu, Esentepe and Candaroğulları.

Climate
Kastamonu has a humid continental climate (Köppen: Dfb, Trewartha: Dc) with cold winters and warm summers. Precipitation is evenly distributed throughout the year, with a noticeable increase during spring.

Transport

The main bus station has bus links to most major Turkish cities. Kastamonu Airport is active. Kastamonu is also the main railroad endpoint for the West Black Sea region.

Notable natives
 Latifî (1491-1582), Ottoman poet
 Iovan Tsaous (Yiannis Eitziridis) (1893–1942), Greek musician and composer
 Oğuz Atay (1934–1977), novelist
 Rıfat Ilgaz (1911–1993), novelist
 Halit Akmansü (1883–1923), military officer in the Ottoman and Turkish armies

Gallery

See also
List of clock towers - Kastamonu has its own Ottoman clock tower (1885)
Paphlagonia

Notes

References
Runciman, Steven (1951) A History of the Crusades, Vol. I: The First Crusade, Cambridge University Press.

Further reading
 Boğaç A. Ergene: Local Court, Provincial Society and Justice in the Ottoman Empire, Legal Practice and Dispute Resolution in Çankırı and Kastamonu (1652-1744). Studies in Islamic Law and Society, volume 17, Brill, Leiden, 2003. .

External links

 Kastamonu, Çatalzeytin local newspaper  
 Kastamonu culture & travel guide
 Kastamonu, Araç Muhacirler köyü

 
Populated places in Kastamonu Province
Kastamonu District